This is a timeline of Haitian history, comprising important legal and territorial changes and political events in Haiti and its predecessor states.  To read about the background to these events, see History of Haiti. See also the list of heads of state of Haïti.

15th century

16th century

17th century

18th century

19th century

20th century

21st century

See also
 Timeline of Port-au-Prince history

References 
 

Haitian
 
Years in Haiti
Haiti history-related lists